Veracity may refer to:

 Veracity (album), a 2008 album by Evacuate Chicago
 Veracity (ethics), an ethical principle
 Veracity (novel), a 2010 novel by Laura Bynum
 Veracity, an automobile from the early 1900s built by the Smith Automobile Company